The 2010 Cape Verdean Cup (Taça Nacional de Cabo Verde de 2010) season was the 4th competition of the regional football cup in Cape Verde. The season started on 20 July and finished with the cup final on 2 August. The cup competition was organized by the Cape Verdean Football Federation (Federação Caboverdiana de Futebol, FCF). Boavista Praia won their last of two cup titles. A month later, they would also win a championship title, currently the only club to win both a cup and a championship title.

A total of 11 clubs participated. 11 played in the first round, five played in the second round, Solpontense started from that round and played its only match where they lost to Botafogo. The final round had three matches played at Estádio da Várzea, the winner were decided on goal totals. Boavista won with a total of 8 goals, runner-up was Botafogo with two goals and third was Sal Rei with nothing as the third match were not held, only two out of three matches were played.

No cup competitions took place in 2011, the next one would be in 2012.

Participating clubs
Sport Sal Rei Club, winner of the Boa Vista Island Cup
SC Morabeza, winner of the Brava Island Cup
Botafogo FC, winner of the Fogo Island Cup
Barreirense FC, winner of the Maio Island Cup
Juventude Sal, winner of the Sal Island Cup
Boavista Praia, winner of the Santiago South Cup
Solpontense FC, winner of the Santo Antão North Cup
Marítimo Porto Novo - winner of the Porto Novo Cup (or Santo Antão South Cup)
FC Talho, winner of the São Nicolau Cup
Batuque FC, winner of the São Vicente Cup

First round
10 clubs took part.. Solpontense directly advanced into the Second Round as that club had no opponent to challenge.

Second round
Six clubs took part

Final round
Only the first two of three matches were played, the third one was not held. Participants in the national championships indicated in I.

|}

See also
2009–10 in Cape Verdean football
2010 Cape Verdean Football Championships

References

External links

Cape Verdean Cup seasons
Cup
Cape Verdean Cup
Cape Verdean Cup